Pacific Coast Feather Company is a Boca Raton, Florida-based manufacturer of basic bedding including pillows, comforters, sheets, and featherbeds.

Owned by the Hanauer family from 1924 through 2017, brothers Nick Hanauer and Adrian Hanauer (fourth generation) were co-chairmen until acquisition of the company by Hollander Sleep Products. President and CEO Mark Eichhorn, also CEO of Hollander Sleep Products, runs the day-to-day operations.

The company sells its products nationwide to major department store chains under the following brand names: Pacific Coast Feather, Down Around, BestFit!, EuroRest, Restful Nights, Calvin Klein, Spring Air, Sheex, Sleep for Success by Dr. Maas, Elie Tahari and Jockey. Additionally, the PCF name itself is licensed across a wide range of brands.

The company operates direct sourcing abroad and maintains six manufacturing plants in North America.

In June 2017 Hollander Sleep Products announced the acquisition of the Pacific Coast Feather Company in a statement posted on its website. Staffing changes occurred, resulting in a temporary disruption of service.

Awards 
 2011 Good Housekeeping names Best Down Pillow and Best Down/Foam Pillow
 2010 Good Housekeeping selects Best Mid-weight Comforter and Best Down Comforter
 2004 QVC Vendor of the Year Award.
 2002, 2003 BJ's Wholesale Club Business Partnership Award.
 2002 QVC Q Star Award.
 2001 JCPenney Supplier Divisional Award – Home Division.
 2000 Marriott Corporation Product Innovation of the Year.
 2000 Sears Partners in Progress Award.

References

External links 

American companies established in 1884
1884 establishments in Washington Territory